The .22 Winchester Short Magnum Rimfire, also called .22 ILARCO or .22 American, was a rimfire cartridge designed for the American-180 rimfire submachine gun. At the time the cartridge was created, the design of the American-180 had been taken over by the Illinois Arms Company, Inc., hence the ILARCO name.

History
Sometime after the Illinois Arms Company, Inc. (ILARCO) purchased the rights to the American-180 they determined a more powerful cartridge would be appropriate, which resulted in the creation of the .22 Magnum Short. The new cartridge was designed so that a simple change of barrel was all that was required to switch between standard .22 Long Rifle, for which the gun was designed, and the new cartridge.

Dimensions and loading
The .22 Short Magnum uses a shorter version of the .22 WMR case with the same 40 grain projectile as the original .22 WMR loading.

See also
 5 mm caliber
 List of rimfire cartridges

References

Pistol and rifle cartridges
Rimfire cartridges
Weapons and ammunition introduced in 1987